Real Madrid Club de Fútbol is a football club based in Madrid, Spain, that competes La Liga, the top flight of Spanish football. Unlike most European football clubs, Real Madrid CF is owned and run by its members (all Spanish), called socios, since its founding. These members elect the president by a ballot, similarly to a limited liability company. The president has the responsibility for the overall management of the club, including formally signing contracts with players and staff. In Spain, it is customary for the president to watch the games in which the first team participates, together with the president from the opposing team.

Legendary Santiago Bernabéu remains the longest-serving president of the club (35 years, from 1943 to 1978). In addition, under Bernabéu's presidency the club won the most trophies (32). In July 2000, former Real player Alfredo Di Stéfano was appointed Honorary President of the club. Overall, the club has had 18 different presidents throughout its history.

List of presidents
Below is the official presidential history of Real Madrid until the present day.

List of honorary presidents

References

Real Madrid CF presidents
Presidents